Mahe Vailanu (born 10 January 1997) is a Tongan Australian rugby union player who plays for the NSW Waratahs in Super Rugby Pacific.

His position of choice is hooker.

Since 2018, Vailanu has played under head coach Darren Coleman.
He followed Coleman from the Warringah Rats to the Gordon Highlanders in 2019, then to the LA Giltinis in 2021 and NSW Waratahs in 2022, having won premierships with the Rats, Highlanders and Giltinis.

Super Rugby statistics

References 

1997 births
Australian rugby union players
Australian sportspeople of Tongan descent
Rugby union hookers
Melbourne Rebels players
Living people
New South Wales Country Eagles players
Australian expatriate rugby union players
Expatriate rugby union players in Japan
Saitama Wild Knights players
Expatriate rugby union players in the United States
LA Giltinis players
Melbourne Rising players
New South Wales Waratahs players
Rugby union players from Taree